Skärholmen is a suburban area in the district of Söderort in  south-western Stockholm, Sweden. Together with Bredäng,  Sätra and Vårberg, it forms the borough of Skärholmen.
The community primarily consisting of Million Programme style apartment buildings from the 1960s and early 1970s. It is one of the larger and more well known suburbs of Stockholm.  Skärholmen Centrum (also now as SKHLM), one of the biggest shopping centres in Sweden is situated in Skärholmen.

Metro station 
The Skärholmen metro station was opened in 1967. The station is on the  Red line (Tunnelbana 2)  of the Stockholm metro.

Sports
The following sports clubs are located in Skärholmen:
 Srbija FF
 IFK Stockholm

References

Districts of Stockholm
Railway stations opened in 1967

Million Programme